Agustín Roberto Radrizzani, SDB (22 September 1944 – 2 September 2020) was an Argentine prelate of the Roman Catholic Church. He served as Archbishop of Mercedes-Luján from 2007 until 2019.

Radrizzani made his profession as a member of the Salesians of Don Bosco on 5 January 1968, and was ordained to the priesthood on 25 March 1972.

On 14 May 1991, he was appointed Bishop of Neuquén by Pope John Paul II. Radrizzani received his episcopal consecration on 20 July from Bishop Argimiro Moure Piñeiro, SDB, with Bishops Jaime de Nevares, SDB, and Jorge Meinvielle, SDB, serving as co-consecrators. He was installed as Neuquén's ordinary on 17 August of that same year.

He was later named Bishop of Lomas de Zamora on 24 April 2001, being installed on the following 23 June. After six years in the diocese, he was promoted by Pope Benedict XVI to Archbishop of Mercedes-Luján on 27 December 2007. Radrizzani was the first Salesian and member of any Roman Catholic religious institute to serve as Archbishop of that see.

Agustín Roberto Radrizzani died following a bout with COVID-19 on 2 September 2020, during the COVID-19 pandemic in Argentina.

References

External links
Catholic-Hierarchy

1944 births
2020 deaths
21st-century Roman Catholic archbishops in Argentina
20th-century Roman Catholic bishops in Argentina
Deaths from the COVID-19 pandemic in Argentina
Salesian bishops
Roman Catholic bishops of Lomas de Zamora
Roman Catholic bishops of Neuquén
Roman Catholic archbishops of Mercedes-Luján